Terence "Terry" Murray (born 22 May 1928, date of death unknown) was a Republic of Ireland soccer international, who was capped once for the Republic of Ireland at senior level, away to Belgium in May 1950.

Murray also played six times for the League of Ireland select team from the period 1948 to 1951 against  Football League (twice), Irish League (twice), Scottish League and West German League teams.

He began his senior career in 1948. A 20-year old junior international, Murray had won numerous honours with St Pauls, including both the FAI and Leinster Junior Cups and had scored two goals for the Irish juniors playing against Scotland in Glasgow the previous April and was signed by Dundalk.

External links
 soccerscene.ie profile
 dundalkfcwhowhos.com profile

References

Republic of Ireland association footballers
Republic of Ireland international footballers
Dundalk F.C. players
1928 births
Year of death missing
Association football outside forwards